Police Constable Lee Bracey (born 11 September 1968) is a former English footballer who played in The Football League for Swansea City, Halifax Town, Bury and Hull City. He is now a police constable for Greater Manchester Police.

Career
Bracey started his career at West Ham United before moving to Swansea City in 1988. He spent three years with the Swans before joining fourth division sides Halifax Town and Bury. He then earned a move to division one side Ipswich Town but after failing to make a single appearance in three years with the club he joined Hull City. After his time in league football Bracey played for several non-league teams. He now works as a constable police officer for Greater Manchester police.

References

External links

English footballers
West Ham United F.C. players
Swansea City A.F.C. players
Halifax Town A.F.C. players
Bury F.C. players
Ipswich Town F.C. players
Hull City A.F.C. players
Chorley F.C. players
Ossett Town F.C. players
Mossley A.F.C. players
Ashton United F.C. players
Rossendale United F.C. players
English Football League players
1968 births
Living people
Association football goalkeepers